Karl-Heinrich Bodenschatz (10 December 1890 – 25 August 1979) was a German general who was the adjutant to Manfred von Richthofen in World War I and the liaison officer between Hermann Göring and Adolf Hitler in World War II.

Biography

Early life and First World War

Bodenschatz was born in Rehau, Bavaria; in 1910 he enlisted in the 8th Bavarian Infantry Regiment and was a cadet at the War Academy in Metz until 1912. Following the German entry into World War I he saw active infantry service on the Western Front and participated in the Battle of Verdun. After being wounded four times, in 1916 he transferred to the Deutsche Luftstreitkräfte as adjutant to Jagdgeschwader 2 and then Jagdgeschwader 1 as the adjutant to Manfred von Richthofen based at Avesnes-le-sac. In June 1918 Hermann Göring took over command of the squadron after von Richthofen's death.

Between the wars
After the war he joined the Reichswehr as a regular officer and served in the 21st infantry regiment from 1919 until April 1933, he had maintained a friendship with Göring and joined the Luftwaffe as his military adjutant and served in this capacity until 1938, visiting Britain in November 1938. In 1939, he warned the Polish military attaché in Berlin that Nazi Germany was planning to invade Poland by the end of the year.

Second World War
During World War II he was the liaison officer between Hitler's headquarters and the Commander-in-Chief of the Luftwaffe until he was seriously injured in 1944 by the 20 July plot bomb at the Wolf's Lair headquarters in Rastenburg, East Prussia. He was fortunate to survive the explosion as two officers immediately to his left and one to his right were killed.

Post-war
He was captured at Reichenhall on 5 May 1945 and served two years in prison. In 1946 he was called as a witness at the Nuremberg Trials of major Nazi war criminals. He died in Erlangen, West Germany, in 1979, aged 88.

Medals and honours 
 Iron Cross (1914) 2nd and 1st class
 Wound Badge (1918) in Silver
 Aviator badge (Prussia)
 Gallipoli Star ("Iron Crescent", Ottoman Empire)
 Knight's Cross Second Class of the Order of the Zähringer Lion with Swords
 Military Merit Order, 4th Class with swords (Bavaria)
 Golden Party Badge (10 December 1940)
 German Cross in Silver on 30 May 1942 as General der Flieger and chief of Ministeramt in the Reichsluftfahrtministerium with the Oberbefehlshaber der Luftwaffe
 Wound Badge 20 July 1944
 Wehrmacht Long Service Award, 4th to 1st class
 War Merit Cross (1939), 1st class with Swords
 Order of Liberty Cross First Class with Oak Leaves and Swords (Finland)

References
Citations

Bibliography

 
 Hunting With Richthofen: The Bodenschatz Diaries: Sixteen Months of Battle with J G Freiherr Von Richthofen No. 1. Grub Street, 1998, .

External links
 Karl Bodenschatz Nuremberg trial testimony at the Nizkor Project

1979 deaths
1890 births
People from Rehau
Luftstreitkräfte personnel
Luftwaffe World War II generals
Recipients of the Iron Cross (1914), 1st class
Recipients of the Order of the Cross of Liberty, 1st Class
People from the Kingdom of Bavaria
Reichswehr personnel
German prisoners of war in World War II held by the United States
Military personnel from Bavaria
Adjutants of Adolf Hitler
Generals of Aviators
20th-century Freikorps personnel